Sir Robert Romer  (23 December 1840 – 19 March 1918) was a British judge. He was a High Court judge 1890-1899, and a Lord Justice of Appeal 1899-1906 when he was known as Lord Justice Romer.

Biography
Romer was born in Kilburn, Middlesex. He attended St John's School, Leatherhead (in Surrey) and excelled at mathematics at Trinity Hall, Cambridge where he was Senior Wrangler in 1863 (the first from Trinity Hall) and was joint winner of Smith's Prize in that year. Following the premature late 1864 death of George Boole, the first professor of maths at Queen's College, Cork, Romer beat out Robert Ball for the vacant position, however he only stayed in Cork from 1865 to 1866. He became QC in 1881, and a bencher of Lincoln's Inn in 1884. The same year he unsuccessfully stood as the Liberal candidate in Brighton.

In 1890 he was appointed High Court judge and assigned to the Chancery Division, receiving the customary knighthood. He served as such until 1899, when he was appointed a Lord Justice of Appeal, in succession to Chitty. He resigned in 1906.

Romer was sworn a Privy Councillor in 1899, and elected a Fellow of the Royal Society in the same year. He was appointed Knight Grand Cross of the Order of the Bath (GCB) in the New Year Honours list 1 January 1901, and was invested by King Edward VII in February the same year.

He was a member of the Royal Commission on South African Hospitals in 1901, during the Boer War. He was a member of the Royal Commission on University Education in London in 1909.

Family
In 1864 he married his first cousin Betty Lemon, daughter of his aunt Helen (Nelly) Romer and Mark Lemon, editor of Punch.  Their sons were Mark Romer, Baron Romer and Sir Cecil Romer. His grandson Sir Charles Robert Romer was also Lord Justice of Appeal. Their daughter Helen Mary married future Lord Chancellor Frederic Maugham.

Arms

References

External links

 
 

1840 births
1918 deaths
Members of the Privy Council of the United Kingdom
Lords Justices of Appeal
Chancery Division judges
Senior Wranglers
Members of Lincoln's Inn
Alumni of Trinity Hall, Cambridge
Knights Grand Cross of the Order of the Bath
Fellows of the Royal Society
Knights Bachelor
People educated at St John's School, Leatherhead
English King's Counsel